Gríðr (or Gríd) is a jötunn in Norse mythology. She is the mother of Víðarr the silent and the consort of Odin.
Saturn's moon Gridr was named after her.

Name 
The poetic Old Norse name Gríðr has been translated as "vehemence, violence, or impetuosity". Its etymology is unclear.

Attestations

Prose Edda 
In Skáldskaparmál (The Language of Poetry), Gríðr is portrayed as equipping the thunder god Thor with her belt of strength, her iron glove, and her staff Gríðarvöl (Gríðr's-staff) on Thor's journey to the abode of Geirröðr.

 Gríðr is also mentioned in a list of troll-wives ("I shall list the names of troll-wives. Grid and Gnissa, Gryla...").

Skaldic poetry 
Gríðarvöl (Gríðr's staff) is also mentioned in the poem Þórsdrápa by the late-10th-century skald Eilífr Goðrúnarson.

Gríðr appears in 10th-century kennings for 'wolf' (the steed of troll-wife) and for 'axe' (that which is dangerous to the life-protector, i.e. shield or helmet).

Other texts 
Saxo Grammaticus refers to her as Grytha, the wife of the legendary king Dan I of Denmark, "a lady whom the Teutons accorded the highest honour". A witch of the same name appears in Illuga saga Gríðarfóstra.

Theory 
Her role as the donor of information and necessary items to the hero has been analyzed by folklorists as a commonplace of folk narrative.

Notes

References

Bibliography 

Gýgjar
Odin